This is a list of prisons within Jiangxi province of the People's Republic of China.

References

Buildings and structures in Jiangxi
Jiangxi